Lessie Wei Chui Kit-yee, SBS, JP is a retired Hong Kong civil servant and Silver Bauhinia Star awardee for her contributions in 2001. Wei is also a Justice of the Peace.

Career
Wei joined the Hong Kong Government in May 1970, one year after graduating from university. Wei was a member of the Trade Officer Grade for 13 years before becoming an Administrative Officer Staff Grade C in 1983. In March 1997, Wei took the position of Director of Agriculture, Fisheries and Conservation. Wei rose to her highest rank of Administrative Officer Staff Grade A, as of January 1, 2000. On January 14, 2002, she went on pre-retirement leave and was succeeded by Thomas Chan Chun-yuen.

Background
Wei served in various bureaus and departments, including the former Trade Department, Security Branch, the former Urban Services Department, the then Chief Secretary's Office and the Financial Services Branch. Wei has held the following positions:
Deputy Director of Urban Services from February 1990 to January 1991
 Deputy Director of Administration from January 1991 to September 1994
 Deputy Secretary for Financial Services from October 1994 to March 1997. 
 Director of Agriculture and Fisheries (later renamed Director of Agriculture, Fisheries and Conservation)

References

External links
 Profile of Mrs Lessie Wei 
Directorate of Agriculture, Fisheries and Conservation references in Hong Kong government publications 
Legco/Hong Kong Legislative Assembly minutes (1996) 
Ibid. (1997)

Hong Kong civil servants
Living people
Recipients of the Silver Bauhinia Star
Year of birth missing (living people)
Place of birth missing (living people)